Sound Bites: Eating on Tour with Franz Ferdinand is a book written by Alex Kapranos from the band Franz Ferdinand. It was published on 2 November 2006.

In September 2005, whilst touring the world with Franz Ferdinand, Alex Kapranos had begun writing about what he ate in the various countries he had visited. The book concentrates heavily on where he eats and the people he eats with and the unusual flavours he tastes on the road. Much of the book is compiled from the column he had for The Guardian.

He said,

References

Music books
Franz Ferdinand (band)